Lieutenant General Shri Krishna Singh, PVSM, UYSM, AVSM is a retired Indian Army General. He served as the Vice Chief of the Army Staff of the Indian Army from 2011 to 2013.

Career
Singh was commissioned shortly after the Indo-Pakistan War of 1971, into 8 Gorkha Rifles. He later joined the Parachute Regiment, and served in combat during counter-insurgency operations in Nagaland and Manipur, and in the Indian Peace Keeping Force (IPKF) in the Sri Lankan Civil War.

Singh commanded a brigade in the Siachen Glacier, the 16th Infantry Division on the Line of Control and the strike corps XIV Corps. As a Major General, he also headed the Indian Military Training Team in Bhutan. After his promotion to Army Commander grade, he commanded the Army Training Command (ARTRAC), and South Western Command, before taking up the post of Vice Chief.

Singh served as Vice Chief of Army Staff, the second-most senior position in the Army, from November 2011 to his retirement in December 2013.

Honours and decorations

References 

Indian generals
Year of birth missing (living people)
Living people
Vice Chiefs of Army Staff (India)
Recipients of the Param Vishisht Seva Medal
Recipients of the Uttam Yudh Seva Medal
Recipients of the Ati Vishisht Seva Medal
Rashtriya Indian Military College alumni